Ji Young-jun (born 15 October 1981 in Seoul) is a South Korean long-distance runner who specializes in the marathon. His personal best times are 13:49.99 minutes in the 5000 metres, achieved in June 2006 in Shibetsu; 29:42.38 minutes in the 10,000 metres, achieved in June 2002 in Uijeongbu; and 2:08:30 hours in the marathon, achieved in April 2009 in Daegu.

He finished seventeenth at the 2004 Olympic Games, and seventh at the 2006 Asian Games. He also competed at the 2003 and 2009 World Championships; on the latter occasion he did not finish the race.

After a few years off his top form, he re-established himself at the 2009 Daegu Marathon by knocking thirteen seconds off his best to win the race in a time of 2:08:30.

He won the gold medal in the marathon at the 2010 Asian games in Guangzhou, China, running 2:11:11.

Achievements

References

1981 births
Living people
South Korean male long-distance runners
Athletes (track and field) at the 2004 Summer Olympics
Olympic athletes of South Korea
Sportspeople from Seoul
South Korean male marathon runners
Asian Games medalists in athletics (track and field)
Athletes (track and field) at the 2002 Asian Games
Athletes (track and field) at the 2006 Asian Games
Athletes (track and field) at the 2010 Asian Games
Asian Games gold medalists for South Korea
Medalists at the 2010 Asian Games
21st-century South Korean people